This is a list of bays of Florida.

Atlantic Coast
Biscayne Bay
Palm Bay

Gulf Coast
Apalachee Bay
Apalachicola Bay
Boca Ciega Bay
Charlotte Harbor
Choctawhatchee Bay
East Bay
Escambia Bay
Estero Bay
Florida Bay
Pensacola Bay
Ponce de Leon Bay
Sarasota Bay
St. Andrews Bay
St. Joseph Bay
Tampa Bay
Whitewater Bay

 
Bays
Bays of Florida